Anjan Chattopadhyay, the sitar player, born in  a Bengali aristocratic family in Calcutta, India, was initiated to the art of sitar playing by his elder brother, a veteran Surbahar player, Pandit Gourisankar Chattopadhyay, a disciple of Pandit Birendra Kishore Roy Chowdhury. In addition to that he started taking further training from Vidushi Kalyani Roy, a reputed sitarist and one of the few disciples of Ustad Vilayat Khan. He also had lessons in vocal music from late Muktipada Datta, a representative of Agra Gharana. Anjan also learned tabla under the late Ustad Shaukat Ali Khan of Farukhabad gharana. Anjan lives in Calcutta.

Performance 
Anjan has performed in hundreds of concerts in India and abroad.  Among them worthy of mentions are some of his concerts in India:
 
 The Dover Lane Music Conference
 India International Center, New Delhi
 All India Music Festival
 Kal-Ke- Kalakar Music Conference, Mumbai
 Salt Lake Music Conference
 National Council of Performing Arts, Mumbai
 West Bangal Government State Music Academy
 Indian Council For Cultural Relations
 Alliance Francaise
 Ustad Bahadur Khan Music Conference
 Sabarmati Gandhi Ashram
 South Bengal Music Conference
 Ustad Keramatullah Khan Memorial Conference
 Bhartiya Sanskriti Parishad, Nagpur
 Jhankar Music Circle, Kolkata
 Swami Haridas Music Conference
 Shree Aurobindo Ashram. Calcutta
 Raipur Music festival, M.P.
 Ustad Amir Khan Music Conference. Calcutta
 Swar Sadhna Samiti. Mumbai
 Sur Singar Samsad Mumbai
 Kalabharati, Mumbai
 Pandit Montu Banerjee memorial music conference
 Sangeet Natak Academy, Lucknow
 Sankalp Music Festival. Sagar, M.P.
 Guru Poornima Festival, Patna
 Sangati Center
 Vistar Music Conference, Kolkata
 Camp Vatsayan, Benaras, etc. etc.

Awards, honors 
In his musical career, Anjan has got numerous awards, and felicitations.
The chronology of awards are as follows:
 In 1986, he was awarded the first prize in All India Music Competition organized by the State Music Academy of West Bengal Government. 
 In 1987, he was felicitated with the title ‘SURMANI’ after performing at Kal-Ke-Kalakar music festival in Mumbai.
 In 1988, he was awarded with the title ‘Sangeet Visharad’ by Pracheen Kalakendra, Chandigarh.  In the same year he got ‘Sangeet Kriya Visharad’ title  from Sourav Academy Board, Kolkata.  On this occasion, the renowned violinist Padmabhushan Pandit V. G. Jog felicitated him after his concert.  
 In 1990, during his tour to U.S.A, the Academy of Indian Music and Fine Arts and University of Maryland, Baltimore County felicitated him with the certificate of Achievement.  
 In that year he got the opportunity to be honored with the GOVERNOR’S CITATION from the Honorable Governor of New Jersey – Mr James Florio.  
 In 1994, Padmabhushan Pandit Jnan Prakash Ghosh, one of the music legends of India, proclaimed Anjan as ‘one of the most talented young sitar players of India".
 Swar-Sadhna Samity of  Mumbai and Rotary Club of  Lake Green Kolkata, honored him on his enthralling performances. 
 In 2004, Anjan received ‘GOVERNOR’S CITATION’ from Mr.Robert Ehrlich, the honourable Governor of the State of Maryland after performing his sitar recital  in presence of the honourable Senator Mr Paul Sarbanes.
 In 2005, Anjan has been awarded with Swami Haridas Samman award given by Surabithi College of Music, Calcutta.
 In 2006, Anjan has been honored with Ustad Vilayat Khan Music Award given by Geetichakra college, Chandannagar, West Bengal.
 In 2007 January Anjan has been selected for Michael Madhusudan Dutt award for his contribution to Indian Classical Music.

Discs 

 Indian Classical Music Sitar ::::     EBI India
 Moods ::::                            Octave Music India
 Sunset ::::                           Aim Records
 Monsoon Raga ::::                     Aim Records
 Raagmala ::::                         VMR, India
 Melodies for the Soul :::             AIMREC. USA
 Eastern Visions ::::                  AIMREC.COM, USA
 Bliss :::                             Musicultimate India

See also 
 Pandit Ravi Shankar
 Ustad Vilayat Khan
 Sangeetpedia

External links  

https://web.archive.org/web/20090123173415/http://sangeetpedia.com/anjanchattopadhyay.html
https://web.archive.org/web/20090926072312/http://www.artists-india.com/resume/anjan_chattopadhyay.php

Living people
Indian male classical musicians
Hindustani instrumentalists
Sitar players
University of Calcutta alumni
Indian encyclopedists
Year of birth missing (living people)
Musicians from Kolkata